Shahin Alam (born 1 August 2001) is a Bangladeshi cricketer. He was part of Bangladesh's squad that won the 2020 Under-19 Cricket World Cup. In January 2021, he was named in the BCB XI's squad for a warm-up match against the touring West Indies team. The following month, he was named in the Bangladesh Emerging squad to play the Ireland Wolves. He made his first-class debut on 14 November 2021, for Chittagong Division in the 2021–22 National Cricket League. He made his List A debut on 30 March 2022, for Khelaghar Samaj Kallyan Samity in the 2021–22 Dhaka Premier Division Cricket League.

References

External links
 

2001 births
Living people
Bangladeshi cricketers
Chittagong Division cricketers
City Club cricketers
Khelaghar Samaj Kallyan Samity cricketers
People from Kurigram District